The Chaser is a 1938 comedy-drama film.

Plot
An ambulance chaser, unethical and disliked by many, attorney Thomas Z. Brandon chases cases in the street, offering to represent clients on trumped-up charges.

A street-car company's owner, Calhoun, resents this practice and hires Dorothy Mason to go undercover to gain evidence against the attorney, pretending to be an accident victim. She sees how a doctor, Prescott, manipulates a client into memorizing certain false information to use in court.

Dorothy learns that Thomas has a good explanation why he's doing this and that Calhoun is actually unscrupulous himself. She perjures herself in court, and Thomas spurns her after learning of her deceit, but ultimately they fall in love and Thomas promises to act more ethically from now on.

Cast
 Dennis O'Keefe as Thomas
 Ann Morriss as Dorothy
 Lewis Stone as Dr. Prescott
 Nat Pendleton as Floppy Phil
 Henry O'Neill as Calhoun

Reception
According to MGM records the movie earned $220,000 in the US and Canada and $102,000 elsewhere, making a $27,000 profit.

References

External links
 
 
 
 

1938 films
Metro-Goldwyn-Mayer films
1938 romantic drama films
American romantic drama films
American black-and-white films
Films scored by Edward Ward (composer)
1930s English-language films
1930s American films